Ox House railway station was a station to the southwest of Shobdon, Herefordshire, England, close to Shobdon Aerodrome.

Ox House was a private station for Shobdon Court, the home of William Bateman-Hanbury, 2nd Baron Bateman who was the first chairman of the Leominster and Kington Railway.

References

Disused railway stations in Herefordshire
Railway stations in Great Britain opened in 1857